The 20th General Assembly of Prince Edward Island represented the colony of Prince Edward Island between September 26, 1854, and 1859.

The Assembly sat at the pleasure of the Governor of Prince Edward Island, Alexander Bannerman.   Edward Thornton was elected speaker.

George Coles was Premier.

Members

The members of the Prince Edward Island Legislature after the general election of 1854 were:

External links 
 Journal of the House of Assembly of Prince Edward Island (1854)

Terms of the General Assembly of Prince Edward Island
1854 establishments in Prince Edward Island
1859 disestablishments in Prince Edward Island